Meyerhofer or Meyerhöfer is a German language habitational surname. Notable people with the name include:
 Lee Meyerhofer (1964), Wisconsin democrat
 Marco Meyerhöfer (1995), German professional footballer
 Michael Meyerhofer (1992), American academic of English literature

References 

German-language surnames
German toponymic surnames